Oneirodes is a genus of fish in the family Oneirodidae.

Species
There are currently 40 recognized species in this genus:
 Oneirodes acanthias (C. H. Gilbert, 1915) (Spiny dreamer)
 Oneirodes alius Seigel & Pietsch, 1978
 Oneirodes amaokai H. C. Ho & Kawai, 2016 (Amaoka's dreamer) 
 Oneirodes anisacanthus (Regan, 1925)
 Oneirodes basili Pietsch, 1974
 Oneirodes bradburyae M. G. Grey, 1956
 Oneirodes bulbosus W. M. Chapman, 1939 
 Oneirodes carlsbergi (Regan & Trewavas, 1932)
 Oneirodes clarkei Swinney & Pietsch, 1988
 Oneirodes cordifer Prokofiev, 2014 
 Oneirodes cristatus (Regan & Trewavas, 1932)
 Oneirodes dicromischus Pietsch, 1974
 Oneirodes epithales J. W. Orr, 1991 (Nightmare dreamer)
 Oneirodes eschrichtii Lütken, 1871 (Bulbous dreamer)
 Oneirodes flagellifer (Regan & Trewavas, 1932)
 Oneirodes haplonema A. L. Stewart & Pietsch, 1998
 Oneirodes heteronema (Regan & Trewavas, 1932)
 Oneirodes kreffti Pietsch, 1974 (Krefft's dreamer)
 Oneirodes luetkeni (Regan, 1925)
 Oneirodes macronema (Regan & Trewavas, 1932)
 Oneirodes macrosteus Pietsch, 1974
 Oneirodes melanocauda Bertelsen, 1951
 Oneirodes micronema Grobecker, 1978
 Oneirodes mirus (Regan & Trewavas, 1932)
 Oneirodes myrionemus Pietsch, 1974
 Oneirodes notius Pietsch, 1974
 Oneirodes parapietschi Prokofiev, 2014 
 Oneirodes pietschi H. C. Ho & K. T. Shao, 2004
 Oneirodes plagionema Pietsch & Seigel, 1980
 Oneirodes posti Bertelsen & Grobecker, 1980
 Oneirodes pterurus Pietsch & Seigel, 1980
 Oneirodes quadrinema H. C. Ho, Kawai & Amaoka, 2016 (Indonesian dreamer) 
 Oneirodes rosenblatti Pietsch, 1974
 Oneirodes sabex Pietsch & Seigel, 1980 (Rough dreamer)
Oneirodes sanjeevani Rajeeshkumar, 2017
 Oneirodes schistonema Pietsch & Seigel, 1980
 Oneirodes schmidti (Regan & Trewavas, 1932)
 Oneirodes sipharum Prokofiev, 2014 
 Oneirodes theodoritissieri Belloc, 1938
 Oneirodes thompsoni (L. P. Schultz, 1934) (Alaska dreamer)
 Oneirodes thysanema Pietsch & Seigel, 1980

References

Oneirodidae
Marine fish genera
Taxa named by Christian Frederik Lütken